Lobelia (M921) is a  of the Belgian Naval Component, launched on 3 February 1988 at the Mercantile-Belyard shipyard in Rupelmonde and christened by Anne Van De Kerckhof, the wife of the then Mayor of Diest, on 25 February 1989. The patronage of Lobelia was accepted by the city of Diest. It was the seventh of the Belgian Tripartite-class minehunters. The Belgian Naval Component announced on its website on 5 November 2007 that Mrs. Van De Kerckhof, the godmother of Lobelia, had died on 27 October. A delegation of the crew of Lobelia attended her funeral.

References

Tripartite-class minehunters of the Belgian Navy
Ships built in Belgium
Ships built in France
Ships built in the Netherlands
1988 ships
Minehunters of Belgium